Ophelia Lucy Lovibond (born 19 February 1986) is an English actress. She is known for her roles as Carina in the film Guardians of the Galaxy, Izzy Gould in the BBC's W1A, Joyce Prigger in HBO's Minx, and Kitty Winter in CBS's Elementary.

Early life and education
Ophelia Lovibond grew up in Shepherd's Bush, London, in a single-parent family. Her mother worked as a Chartered Psychologist at Wormwood Scrubs Prison. She has a brother and a sister. Lovibond attended Latymer Upper School on a scholarship. She also attended the Young Blood theatre company, a youth drama club, in Hammersmith. She graduated from the University of Sussex with a degree in English Literature in 2008.

Acting career

Television
Lovibond's first television appearance was at the age of 12 in the Channel 4 sitcom The Wilsons.  She said she lied about her age to win the role.

She appeared in Elliot Hegarty’s FM and the British period drama Heartbeat. She also played Izzy Gould in the BBC satire W1A.

Lovibond was a regular on season 3 of Elementary as Sherlock's new apprentice, Kitty Winter. She also made an appearance in episodes 15 and 16 of season 5, as well as in season 7.

In 2016, she played the role of Lady Alexandra Lindo-Parker in Sky1 series Hooten & The Lady.

She appeared in a guest role in the 2019 series Whiskey Cavalier as MI6 agent Emma Davies.

She stars as Joyce Prigger in the HBO comedy series Minx.

She also appeared as Rachel in the first episode, "Sardines", of the first series of the British black comedy anthology series Inside No. 9 Written by Steve Pemberton and Reece Shearsmith.

In 2022, Lovibond played Carrie Symonds in the TV series This England.

Film
Lovibond made her film debut in Roman Polanski's Oliver Twist in 2005. She had a part in the John Lennon biopic Nowhere Boy.  She played a leading role in the film 4.3.2.1, and had roles in the 2011 films London Boulevard, No Strings Attached and Mr. Popper's Penguins.  Lovibond played Teri in the BFI/BBC film based on the award winning novel, 8 Minutes Idle, and Carina, The Collector's slave, in the 2014 film Guardians of the Galaxy.

Radio
BBC Radio 4 Lobby Land (Series 1, June 2018).

Theatre
In 2015, Lovibond made her professional stage debut in the revival of Lucy Prebble's The Effect, directed by Daniel Evans. The following year, she appeared as Elizabeth Barry in Stephen Jeffreys' The Libertine at London's Theatre Royal Haymarket.

In 2017, she played Lois, the eponymous character, in Githa Sowerby's The Stepmother. She played Lou in Barney Norris’s 2018 play Nightfall  and starred in the revival of David Hare's The Bay at Nice.

Others
Lovibond appeared in Gabrielle Aplin's February 2013 music video "Please Don't Say You Love Me".

Personal life
She married actor Henry Pettigrew on 1 May 2022. The couple met while starring in The Effect.

Acting credits

Film

Television

Music videos

Theatre

References

External links
 
 Ophelia Lovibond on Instagram

1986 births
Living people
20th-century English actresses
21st-century English actresses
Actresses from London
Alumni of the University of Sussex
English child actresses
English film actresses
English television actresses
People educated at Latymer Upper School
People from Hammersmith